Stenoria is a genus of blister beetles from the family Meloidae. Their larvae develop as parasitoids and brood parasites of the larvae of solitary bees of the families Megachilidae, Colletidae and Andrenidae. The genus contains more than 50 species They are found in the Palearctic from the Canary Islands east to Afghanistan, Tibet and north western China, and also in southern and eastern Africa.

Species
The following species are among those included in the genus Stenoria:

 Stenoria analis Schaum, 1859 (ivy bee blister beetle)
 Sentoria apicalis (Latreille, 1804)
 Stenoria hessei Kaszab, 1953
 Sentoria laterimaculata (Reitter, 1898) 
 Sentoria thakkola  Shawaller, 1996

References

Meloidae
Tenebrionoidea